The Pittsburgh Piranhas was a semi-pro basketball team that began in 1994 as part of the Continental Basketball Association. The team played its home games at the A.J. Palumbo Center at  Duquesne University in Pittsburgh. From 1983–1985 the Piranhas were known as the Louisville Catbirds and then the La Crosse Catbirds from 1985 until moving to Pittsburgh in 1994. During their first year in Pittsburgh, the Piranhas made it to the CBA Championship. The team was defeated in a best of seven series against the Yakima Sun Kings.

The team lasted one season. According to Bob Murphy, the owner of the Piranhas, the reason for the collapse of the franchise was attendance, an average of 1,600. For the team to be profitable, it needed an average of 3,000.

1994-95 Playoffs

Reference:

References

Basketball teams in Pittsburgh 
Piranhas
Defunct basketball teams in Pennsylvania
Basketball teams in Pennsylvania
1994 establishments in Pennsylvania
Basketball teams established in 1994
Sports clubs disestablished in 1995
1995 disestablishments in Pennsylvania